Two submarines of the United States Navy have borne the name USS Queenfish, named in honor of the queenfish, a small food fish found off the Pacific coast of North America.

  was a Balao-class submarine, commissioned in 1944 and struck in 1963.
 , was a Sturgeon-class submarine, commissioned in 1966 and struck in 1992.

United States Navy ship names